The Fiji men's national field hockey team represents Fiji in international field hockey competitions and is controlled by the Fiji Hockey Federation.

Results

Oceania Cup
2005 – 
2015 –

Hockey World League

*Draws include knockout matches decided on a penalty shoot-out.

Pacific Games
1979 - 
2015 -

See also

Fiji women's national field hockey team

References

Oceanian men's national field hockey teams
Field hockey
National team
Men's sport in Fiji